Akidnognathidae is an extinct family of therocephalian therapsids from the Late Permian and Early Triassic of South Africa, Russia and China. The family includes many large-bodied therocephalians that were probably carnivorous, including Moschorhinus and Olivierosuchus. One akidnognathid, Euchambersia, may even have been venomous. Akidnognathids have robust skulls with a pair of large caniniform teeth in their upper jaws. The family is morphologically intermediate between the more basal therocephalian group Scylacosauridae and the more derived group Baurioidea.

Classification

History
The first family-level name used to classify an akidnognathid was Euchambersidae, erected by South African paleontologist Lieuwe Dirk Boonstra in 1934, in reference for the genus Euchambersia, which is possibly one of the oldest known venomous tetrapods. In 1940, German paleontologist Friedrich von Huene changed the spelling of the name to Euchambersiidae, the correct form of Latin. Akidnognathidae was first named in 1954 by South African paleontologists Sidney H. Haughton and A. S. Brink. It included several therocephalians still recognized as akidnognathids as well as several now classified as scylacosaurids. English and American paleontologists D. M. S. Watson and Alfred Romer moved many of these therocephalians into the family Whaitsiidae in 1956, although many were moved back to Akidnognathidae in later years. Whaitsiids and akidnognathids are similar in appearance, leading some paleontologists to propose placing them in a superfamily called Whaitsioidea. Moschorhinidae was erected as another name for the family in 1974, and Annatherapsididae was proposed in 1975. Three subfamilies were also proposed in 1975: Annatherapsidinae, Moschorhininae and Euchambersiinae. While the name Euchambersiidae may have priority over Akidnognathidae because it was named first, Akidnognathidae is currently considered the valid name because it is based on the first named genus of the group, Akidnognathus (Akidnognathus was named in 1918 while Euchambersia was named in 1931).

Phylogeny
Topology recovered by the 2016 analysis of Huttenlocker et al. is showed below.

References

Permian synapsids
Lopingian first appearances
Early Triassic extinctions
 
Prehistoric therapsid families